Calliostoma turnerarum, common name Turner's top shell, is a species of medium-sized deepwater sea snail, a marine gastropod mollusc in the family Calliostomatidae, the calliostoma top snails.

Some authors place this taxon in the subgenus Calliostoma (Maurea)

Description
The height of the shell attains 57 mm.

Distribution
This marine species occurs off New Zealand.

References

 Marshall, 1995. A revision of the recent Calliostoma species of New Zealand (Mollusca:Gastropoda:Trochoidea). The Nautilus 108(4):83-127

External links

Further reading 
 Powell A. W. B., New Zealand Mollusca, William Collins Publishers Ltd, Auckland, New Zealand 1979 

turnerarum
Gastropods of New Zealand
Gastropods described in 1964